A swimming hole is a place in a river, stream, creek, spring, or similar natural body of water, which is large enough and deep enough for a person to swim in. Common usage usually refers to fresh, moving water and thus not to oceans or lakes.

In the UK swimming at natural swimming holes has a long history and has recently become known as "wild swimming", especially since the publication of bestselling books on the subject by Kate Rew and Daniel Start.  In southern Australia, a compendium of swimming holes was first characterised by Brad Neal in his 2004 publication of the first edition of the Guide to Freshwater Swimming Holes in Victoria, Australia.

Nude swimming is a well-established tradition at some more remote swimming holes and is an attraction for many natural swimming fans, but in many parts of the world remains an illegal activity.

History 

In Europe, as the nineteenth century dawned, a new era of contemporary artists were rediscovering the appeal of the swimming hole. The waterfall, surrounded by trees and mountains, was now regarded as the quintessence of beauty. William Wordsworth, Samuel Taylor Coleridge and Thomas de Quincey spent much time bathing in the mountain pools of the Lake District. The study and search for the ‘picturesque’ and ‘sublime’ – an almost scientific measure of loveliness and proportion in the landscape – had reached epidemic proportions. The fashionable tours of Provence or Tuscany were replaced by trips to the valleys of Wales, and the dales of the UK's Cumbria and Yorkshire, as Turner and Constable painted a prodigious flow of falls, tarns and ponds.

In southern Australia, swimming in natural swimming holes was popular until around the time of the 1956 Olympics in Melbourne.  In the first half of the 20th century there were several swimming clubs along the Yarra River in Melbourne, such as at Deep Rock, for example.  Numerous chlorinated, municipal swimming pools were built across Victoria in the lead up to the 1956 Olympics, which changed the community's swimming preferences to the local pool, rather than the local river.  The swimming clubs along the Yarra River closed in response to this change in preferences.  Some of these pre-Olympic swimming pools still exist, such as at Hepburn Pool in central Victoria, and Seven Creeks in Euroa.

Safety 
Safety is a concern with swimming in natural settings. Typically there are no lifeguards. Currents can be swift and, in larger rivers, are often hidden beneath the surface. Diving or jumping is especially dangerous as the depth varies from season to season, and there may be hidden rocks below the surface resulting in broken necks or backs and paralysis or death. 
Alcohol consumption while swimming is especially dangerous, and contributes to at least 20% of deaths by drowning.

References

External links
SwimmingHoles.info:, on-line guide to swimming holes and hot springs - directions and details on 1000 beautiful, natural places for a cool swim or a hot soak.
Day Trips with a Splash: Hiking guides to swimming holes in California, Southwest, New England, Adirondacks and Appalachians.  Hundreds of trips with photos, maps and GPS.
Swimming Hole Heaven guide to swimming holes in Australia, New Zealand and Fiji

For Australian swimming holes there is an online guide http://wildswimmingaustralia.com and an alternative guide at https://swimmingholeheaven.com/australia.htm.  For swimming holes in the United States see http://swimmingholes.org.

Swimming pools